New Ellenton is a city in Aiken County, South Carolina, United States. The population was 2,052 at the 2010 census. It is part of the Augusta, Georgia metropolitan area.

History
New Ellenton was formed from the citizens of Ellenton, a farming town chartered in 1880 and situated on the Charleston and Western Carolina Railway in Barnwell County near the Aiken County line. Upon the approval of President Truman in 1950 of the Savannah River Site for the production of hydrogen bombs, the U.S. government forced 6,000 people in the surrounding area to move.

Geography
South Carolina Highway 19 is Main Street for the community, leading north  to Aiken, the county seat, and south 1 mile to U.S. Route 278, which leads west  to Augusta, Georgia, and southeast  to Barnwell.

Demographics

2020 census

As of the 2020 United States census, there were 2,210 people, 937 households, and 576 families residing in the town.

2000 census
As of the census of 2000, there were 2,250 people, 876 households, and 616 families residing in the town. The racial makeup of the town was 60.62% White, 35.82% African American, 0.58% Native American, 0.36% Asian, 0.89% from other races, and 1.73% from two or more races. Hispanic or Latino of any race were 2.18% of the population.

There were 876 households, out of which 28.7% had children under the age of 18 living with them, 50.3% were married couples living together, 15.3% had a female householder with no husband present, and 29.6% were non-families. 26.4% of all households were made up of individuals, and 9.8% had someone living alone who was 65 years of age or older. The average household size was 2.54 and the average family size was 3.06.

In the town the population was spread out, with 24.8% under the age of 18, 8.1% from 18 to 24, 26.8% from 25 to 44, 23.8% from 45 to 64, and 16.4% who were 65 years of age or older. The median age was 39 years. For every 100 females, there were 91.8 males. For every 100 females age 18 and over, there were 87.3 males.

The median income for a household in the town was $38,125, and the median income for a family was $45,521. Males had a median income of $41,250 versus $21,810 for females. The per capita income for the town was $17,915. About 6.9% of families and 11.8% of the population were below the poverty line, including 16.3% of those under age 18 and 11.0% of those age 65 or over.

Education
New Ellenton has a public library, a branch of the ABBE Regional Library System.

References

External links
City of New Ellenton official website
 I Don't Live There Anymore: The Ellenton Story, musical by Lawrence Holofcener and Gerard Kenny

Cities in Aiken County, South Carolina
Cities in South Carolina
Augusta metropolitan area